Sartana's Here… Trade Your Pistol for a Coffin ("There is Sartana… Sell the Pistol and Buy a Coffin") AKA A Fistful of Lead is a 1970 Spaghetti Western that is the third of the Sartana film series with George Hilton taking over the lead role from Gianni Garko. The film was shot in Italy and directed by Giuliano Carnimeo.

Plot
Bounty hunter Sartana is eagerly awaiting to kill or capture a wanted man who is riding shotgun on a shipment of gold. Interrupting Sartana's picnic and bounty hunting, a gang of Mexican Bandidos kill all the outriders, but leave the gold intact and ride away but not before throwing dynamite into the wagon. Sartana prevents the explosion and discovers the gold sacks in the wagon are full of sand.

Disguised as a Mexican peon, Sartana tracks the Mexicans to their lair and kills several of them before going to the town of Appaloosa where he discovers that the Bandidos were paid by Spencer, the owner of the mine to commit a fake robbery so Spencer can keep the majority of gold for himself. Sartana pits the surviving Mexicans against Spencer, but also faces greedy but impoverished saloon owner Trixie and rival bounty hunter Sabbath, both of whom have their eyes on the gold.

Cast

 George Hilton as  Sartana
 Charles Southwood as  Sabbath 
 Erika Blanc as  Trixie 
 Piero Lulli as  Samuel Spencer 
 Nello Pazzafini as  Mantas 
  Carlo Gaddi as  Baxter 
  Aldo Barberito as  Angelo 
 Linda Sini as  Mantas' Wife 
  Marco Zuanelli as Dead Eye Golfay 
 Luciano Rossi as  Flint Fossit  
  Fortunato Arena as  Old man 
 John Bartha as  Sheriff 
 Federico Boido as  Joe Fossit 
 Luigi Bonos as  Posada Owner 
 Armando Calvo as  Hoagy 
  Spartaco Conversi as Emiliano 
  Furio Meniconi as  Romero

Release
Sartana's Here… Trade Your Pistol for a Coffin was released in Italy in August 1970.

References

External links

1970 films
1970s Italian-language films
1970 Western (genre) films
Spaghetti Western films
Films directed by Giuliano Carnimeo
Films scored by Francesco De Masi
1970s Italian films